Hobbs Point is the northeastern end of Brooklyn Island in Wilhelmina Bay, off the west coast of Graham Land, Antarctica. It was charted by the Belgian Antarctic Expedition under Gerlache, 1897–99, and was named by the UK Antarctic Place-Names Committee in 1960 for Graham J. Hobbs, a Falkland Islands Dependencies Survey geologist at the Danco Island station in 1957 and 1958 who made a geologic reconnaissance survey of the coast between Cape Murray and Cape Willems.

References

Headlands of Graham Land
Danco Coast